Allison "Ali" Gibson (born 27 March 1993) is an American basketball player for the Puerto Rican national team.  Ali played NCAA college basketball for Oregon State from 2011 to 2015.

She made the All-star Team for the 2017 FIBA Women's AmeriCup where the Puerto Rican Nation team won a bronze medal and secured a bid to the 2018 FIBA Women's Basketball World Cup.

Oregon State statistics 

Source

References

External links

1993 births
Living people
Basketball players at the 2019 Pan American Games
Basketball players at the 2020 Summer Olympics
Olympic basketball players of Puerto Rico
Oregon State Beavers women's basketball players
Pan American Games medalists in basketball
Puerto Rican women's basketball players
Shooting guards
Basketball players from Stockton, California
Pan American Games bronze medalists for Puerto Rico
Medalists at the 2019 Pan American Games
21st-century American women